The Albatros D.X was a German prototype single-seat fighter biplane developed in 1918 in parallel with the Albatros D.IX.

Design and development
The D.X used the same slab-sided and flat-bottomed fuselage as the D.IX, which was a departure from previous Albatros designs, but was powered by a 145 kW (195 hp) Benz Bz.IIIbo water-cooled V8 engine in place of the D.IX's Mercedes D.IIIa straight-six.

The D.X participated in the second D-type contest at Adlershof in June 1918, but development ceased at the prototype stage.

Specifications (D.X)

See also

References

Notes

Bibliography

D.10
1910s German fighter aircraft
Single-engined tractor aircraft
Biplanes
Aircraft first flown in 1918